M·CORE is a low-power, RISC-based microcontroller architecture developed by Motorola (subsequently Freescale, now part of NXP), intended for use in embedded systems. Introduced in late 1997, the architecture combines a 32-bit internal data path with 16-bit instructions, and includes a four-stage instruction pipeline. Initial implementations used a 360nm process and ran at 50 MHz.

M·CORE processors employ a von Neumann architecture with shared program and data bus—executing instructions from within data memory is possible. Motorola engineers designed M·CORE to have low power consumption and high code density.

References 

Computer-related introductions in 1997
Microcontrollers